Ḱ ḱ (K with acute accent) is used in the following sense:
transliteration of Cyrillic Kje that is used in Macedonian.
 in the Saanich orthography
representing the Proto-Indo-European phoneme *

Encodings

The HTML codes are:
&#7728; for Ḱ (upper case)
&#7729; for ḱ (lower case)

The Unicode codepoints are U+1E30 for Ḱ and U+1E31 for ḱ.

Latin letters with diacritics